The 1993 FIBA European Championship for Cadettes was the 10th edition of the European basketball championship for U16 women's teams, today known as FIBA U16 Women's European Championship. 12 teams featured in the competition, held in Poprad, Slovakia, from 17 to 25 July 1993.

Russia won their first title in their first appearance after the dissolution of the Soviet Union in 1991.

Participating teams

Preliminary round
In the preliminary round, the twelve teams were allocated in two groups of six teams each. The top two teams of each group advanced to the semifinals. The third and fourth place of each group qualified for the 5th-8th playoffs. The last two teams of each group qualified for the 9th-12th playoffs.

Group A

Group B

Playoffs

9th-12th playoff

5th-8th playoff

Championship playoff

Final standings

External links
 Official Site

FIBA U16 Women's European Championship
1993–94 in European women's basketball
1993 in Slovak sport
International youth basketball competitions hosted by Slovakia
International women's basketball competitions hosted by Slovakia